Microlophus habelii, commonly known as the Marchena lava lizard, is a species of lava lizard endemic to the Galapagos island of Marchena.

Etymology
The specific name, habelii, is in honor of German-American naturalist Simeon Habel.

Taxonomy
M. habelii is commonly assigned to the genus Microlophus but has also been assigned to the genus Tropidurus, in which it was originally described.

References

Further reading
Steindachner F (1876). "Die Schlangen und Eidechsen der Galapagos-Inseln ". Zoologisch-Botanischen Gesellschaft in Wien 1876: 303–329. (Tropidurus habelii, new species). (in German).
Swash, Andy; Still, Rob (2000). Birds, Mammals, & Reptiles of the Galápagos Islands: an identification guide. New Haven and London: Yale University Press. 168 pp. . (Microlophus habelii, p. 120 + Plate 42).

habelii
Endemic reptiles of the Galápagos Islands
Lizards of South America
Reptiles of Ecuador
Reptiles described in 1876
Taxa named by Franz Steindachner